The Jacob Ehrenhardt Jr. House, also known as the 1803 House, is a historic home located in Emmaus, Pennsylvania. It was built in 1803 for Jacob Ehrenhardt Jr., a son of one of the town's founders.

History
Built in 1803, the Jacob Ehrenhardt Jr. House is a -story, fieldstone house with a Federal side-hall plan. It was built for Jacob Ehrenhardt Jr. whose father, Jacob Ehrenhardt Sr., had been one of the founders of Emmaus as a settlement of the Moravian Church in 1747. The home's original owner, Jacob Ehrenhardt Jr., was a member of the Northampton County militia in 1782, and served in the American Revolution. Expelled from the Moravian Church for serving in the military, he was later reaccepted into the church, and supported himself as a shoemaker, farmer and tavern keeper.

This historic house has a -story, rear kitchen wing, and features a slate-covered roof.

Occupied into the 1950s, it was restored in the 1980s. It is open as a historic house museum. Originally it had changed so that the toilet was near the old living room. A Rodale-funded restoration put furniture back in their correct rooms.

It was added to the National Register of Historic Places in 2003.

Present day usage
The house is open for tours by appointment by the Friends of 1803 House.

References

External links
Official website

Emmaus, Pennsylvania
Federal architecture in Pennsylvania
Historic house museums in Pennsylvania
Historic House Museums of the Pennsylvania Germans
Houses completed in 1803
Houses in Lehigh County, Pennsylvania
Houses on the National Register of Historic Places in Pennsylvania
Museums in Lehigh County, Pennsylvania
National Register of Historic Places in Lehigh County, Pennsylvania